Struthio wimani is an extinct species of ratite bird from the Pliocene of China.

Footnotes

References
 
 
 

Pliocene birds
Neogene birds of Asia
Fossil taxa described in 1931
wimani